Rakya Monastery is a Buddhist monastery in Qinghai, China.

References

Buddhist monasteries in Qinghai
Gelug monasteries and temples
Tibetan Buddhist temples in Qinghai